"Let's Go Blue" is a short song most often associated with the University of Michigan, but widely performed during high school and professional sports as well. It was composed by Joe Carl and first arranged by Albert Ahronheim in the 1970s. The song consists of 32 bars and is 40 seconds long.

History
The melody to "Let's Go Blue" was written by Joe Carl, with various dates given for its composition is 1974 or later, including 1975 and 1976. Carl, who at the time of the song's composition was an undergraduate student at the University of Michigan and tuba player in the Michigan Marching Band, improvised the melody as a "time-out ditty" for use during a hockey game at Yost Ice Arena. The song's simple lyrics were spontaneously created by Michigan band director George Cavender who shouted them in a moment of enthusiasm after the song had been performed several times; the lyrics quickly caught on with the crowd. The song was subsequently arranged for band by Albert Ahronheim and, according to one source, first performed at a football game in September 1975 when Michigan played Stanford University. Another source claims the first football performance of the song occurred in November 1976 against Purdue University.

The song "went viral" after it was played by the Michigan Marching Band during the national telecast of the 1976 Orange Bowl. Sheet music for the song was published in 1978 following by an organ version in 1983.

Since its debut at Michigan, the melody has been used by Pennsylvania State University, DePaul University, the University of Nebraska at Lincoln, Purdue University, and North Carolina State University, in addition to countless high school and professional sports teams. By 1984, Carl and Ahronheim were each receiving approximately $1,000 annually in ASCAP royalty payments for the song.It is also heard at New York Rangers games at Madison Square Garden, where the fans chant "Potvin Sucks" in place of "Let's Go Blue".

See also
 "The Victors"

References

External links
 "Let's Go Blue" composer Carl performing the song at Sumner High School in Sumner, Washington in 2014 (YouTube video)

University of Michigan
Year of song unknown
1970s songs
Articles containing video clips
American college songs
College fight songs in the United States
Big Ten Conference fight songs